In Greek mythology, Phereclus or Phereclos, son of Tecton, was the shipbuilder who constructed the boat that Paris used to kidnap Helen. Meriones targeted him and killed him by ramming a spear into his right buttock. Phereclus was a target because he built Paris' ships, and he could make other contraptions of war.

In the Iliad, Homer vividly illustrates Phereclus' death in book five:

Namesake 
 2357 Phereclos, Jovian asteroid named after Phereclus

References 
 

Shipwrights
People of the Trojan War